This is a complete list of cities in Crimea by population at the 2014 Crimean Federal District Census.

External links
 Results of the 2014 Crimean census 

Crimea